Denis John Williams  (1908–1990) was a Welsh neurologist and epileptologist.

Biography
Denis Williams graduated from the University of Manchester with BSc in 1929, MB ChB in 1932, and MD in 1935.

In 1936 Denis Williams returned and brought the first electroencephalograph machine that was used regularly for clinical work in the UK. He qualified MRCP in 1937 and graduated MSc in 1938. During WWII he became a squadron leader in the Royal Air Force Volunteer Reserve and worked at the Military Hospital for Head Injuries under Charles Symonds, who was knighted in 1946. Williams graduated DSc in 1942 and was elected FRCP in 1943. Symonds and Williams published in 1943 Clinical and Statistical Study of Neurosis Precipitated by Flying Duties. Williams was promoted to wing commander before demobilisation.

He was appointed in 1946 physician to the National Hospital for Nervous Diseases and to St George’s Hospital. In the late 1940s he was a mentor to Basil Gerald Parsons-Smith. In 1951 Williams was appointed Civil Consultant in Neurology and Electroencephalography to the RAF. In 1955 he gave the Bradshaw Lecture and was appointed CBE. He retired from St George's Hospital in 1968 and from the National Health Service in 1974. In 1971 he was a founder trustee of the Brain Research Trust. For a number of years he was the editor of Brain: A Journal of Neurology.

Selected publications

References

1908 births
1990 deaths
20th-century Welsh medical doctors
British neurologists
Alumni of the University of Manchester
Physicians of St George's Hospital
People from Bangor, Gwynedd
Royal Air Force Volunteer Reserve personnel of World War II
Commanders of the Order of the British Empire
Fellows of the Royal College of Physicians
Epileptologists